Khel Khel Mein may refer to:
 Khel Khel Mein (1975 film), an Indian Hindi-language black comedy suspense thriller film
 Khel Khel Mein (2021 film), a Pakistani historical drama film
 Khel Khel Mein Foundation, an Indian non-profit organisation